John Michael Sedivy is the Hermon C. Bumpus Professor of Biology and a Professor of Medical Science at Brown University. He is listed as a F1000 Prime faculty member and on Who's Who in Gerontology. He has published over 130 original articles.

He wrote the first book on gene targeting in 1992. In 2006, he published the first comprehensive in vivo quantification of cellular senescence in aging primates. That year, his lab also discovered how (through the Polycomb pathway) c-Myc contributes to the regulation of chromatin states. His research has found that mice missing one copy of the Myc transcription factor live longer than wild-type mice.

He is co-Editor-in-Chief of the journal Aging Cell, and is chair of the 2015 Gordon Research Conference on the Biology of Aging.

Bibliography

Books
Sedivy, J. M., & Joyner, A. L. (1992). Gene targeting. WH Freeman and company.

Selected publications
Sedivy, J. M., & Sharp, P. A. (1989). Positive genetic selection for gene disruption in mammalian cells by homologous recombination. Proceedings of the National Academy of Sciences, 86(1), 227-231.

Awards
 1974	Ontario Scholar 
 1981	Ryan Foundation Fellow 
 1989	March of Dimes Basil O'Connor Starter Scholar 
 1990	Presidential Young Investigator 
 1991	Andrew Mellon Award 
 2006	Hermon C. Bumpus Endowed Chair in Biology, Brown University 
 2007	Senior Research Scholar in Aging, Ellison Medical Foundation 
 2009	NIH MERIT Award, National Institute on Aging 
 2011	Glenn Award for Research in Biological Mechanisms of Aging 
 2015	Chair, Gordon Research Conference on the Biology of Aging

References

External links
John M Sedivy's research works Brown University

Living people
American biologists
American gerontologists
Year of birth missing (living people)
Brown University faculty
University of Toronto alumni
Harvard University alumni